Serine hydroxymethyltransferase 2 is an enzyme that in humans is encoded by the SHMT2 gene.

References